"A Soldier Speaks" is a song from 1944, with music and lyrics by Peter DeRose, and published by Robbins Music Corp.

References 

Bibliography
Furia, Philip. The Poets of Tin Pan Alley: A History of America's Great Lyricists. New York: Oxford University Press, 1990.  
Jasen, David A. Tin Pan Alley: The Composers, the Songs, the Performers, and Their Times : the Golden Age of American Popular Music from 1886 to 1956. New York: D.I. Fine, 1988. . 
Paas, John Roger. “America Sings of War: American Sheet Music from World War I”. Wiesbaden: Harrassowitz Vertag, 2014.  
Parker, Bernard S. “World War I Sheet Music: 9,670 Patriotic Songs Published in the United States, 1914–1920, with More Than 600 Covers Illustrated. Jefferson, N.C.: McFarland, 2007.  

Songs about soldiers
1944 songs
Songs with music by Peter DeRose
Songs of World War II